Joseph Van Daele (16 December 1889 in Wattrelos, France – 14 February 1948 in Amiens, France) was a Belgian champion cyclist who was a professional rider between 1912 and 1926. He participated in many top cycle races of the time including the Tour de France where he finished eighth in 1919.

Palmarès

1910
2nd Ronde van België, Amateur

1911
1st Liège–Bastogne–Liège
1st Ronde van België, Independent (professional)
1st Antwerpen - Menen
2nd Bruxelles - Liège (BEL)

1912
2nd Paris - Menin
3rd Brussel - Oupeye

1913
1st  Belgian National Road Race Championships
1st Tour du Hainaut
2nd Tour of Flanders
2nd Etoile Caroloregienne
2nd Stage 9 Tour de France, Nice

1914
2nd Belgian National Road Race Championships
3rd Paris–Brussels

1919
2nd Belgian National Road Race Championships
8th Tour de France
3rd Stage 1 Tour de France, Le Havre
3rd Stage 14 Tour de France, Dunquerque

1920
2nd Stage 9 Tour de France, Nice

1921
1st Stage 1 Ronde van België, Ghent

1926
2nd Paris - Arras
2nd Paris - Dinant

References

1889 births
1948 deaths
People from Wattrelos
Belgian male cyclists
Sportspeople from Nord (French department)
Cyclists from Hauts-de-France